Helene & gänget was a dansband in Kristianstad in Sweden, founded 1990 by members of the Färmarna dansband. The band broke through in 1995 with the album Segla din båt i hamn. The band broke up in 2002 and its singer Helene Persson begun acting as SR Kristianstad programme host. Famous songs recorded by the band are Segla din båt i hamn, En korg med blommor and Nånstans så finns du.

Members
Helene Persson - vocals (1990-2002)
 Henric Svensson - keyboard (1990-1994)
 Lars Färm - guitar (1990-1996)
Magnus Olsson - drums (1990-2002)
Roland Andersson - bass (1990-2002)
Fredrik Jansson - keyboard, accordion, vocals (1994-1998)
Ulf Nilsson - guitar (1996-1997)
 Mattias Olofsson - guitar (1997-2002)
 Magnus Persson - keyboard, accordion, vocals (1998-2002)

Discography

Albums
Segla din båt i hamn - 1995
Det är du som är livet - 1997
Helene & gänget - 1998
Som ett ljus - 2000

Compilation albums
Stå på egna ben - 1996
Gløm inte bort - 1998
Nånstans så finns du - 2001

EP's
Strunta i etiketten - 1993

Singles
Sticka iväg/Vinden har vänt - 1990
Jag sjunger för dej (I Write You a Love Song) - 1991
Enkel resa/Jag sjunger för dej (I Write You a Love Song) - 1991
Vindens sång/drömmar av guld - 1993
Segla din båt i hamn/Om du ger mig tid - 1994
Nyckeln till mitt hjärta/Rätt eller fel - 1997
En korg med blommor/Om man tar varje dag som den kommer - 1997
Över land, över hav/En man för en kvinna som jag - 2001
Så speglas kärleken/Fågel, fisk & mittemellan - 2002

Svensktoppen songs
Varje morgondag - 1994
Segla din båt i hamn - 1995
Stå på egna ben - 1995
Glöm inte bort - 1996-1997
En korg med blommor - 1997
Det är du som är livet - 1997
Mitt livs lyckligaste sommar - 1998
En enda fråga - 1999
Som ett ljus - 1999-2000
En liten, liten bit - 2000
Låt ödet styra - 2000
Nånstans så finns du - 2000
Över land, över hav - 2001
Så speglas kärleken - 2002

Failed to enter Svensktoppen 
Jag sjunger för dig -1991
Drömmar av guld-1992
Du får mig att längta - 1998

References

External links
 Helene & gänget 

1990 establishments in Sweden
2002 disestablishments in Sweden
Dansbands
Musical groups disestablished in 2002
Musical groups established in 1990